Hue Football Club, simply known as Hue, is a Vietnamese football club from the city of Huế, currently play in the V.League 2.

History
Hue has a long history of football but no one is sure certain football team first established in Hue in time.

According to some data for the record, then to 20, the football game was held in Hue. Often occur where the soccer match between teams of French soldiers, the team of the Vietnamese court at Hue is "Sep" is now the North Shore River Village, next to Dong Ba Market.

Current squad
As of 18 August 2022

Achievements

National competitions
League
V.League 1:
 Runners-up :  1995
V.League 2:
 Runners-up :  2015, 2017
 Third place : 2004, 2006
Second League:
 Winners :  2013
Cup
Vietnamese Cup:
 Runners-up : 2002

Kit suppliers and shirt sponsors

Season-by-season record

References

External links

Football clubs in Vietnam
1976 establishments in Vietnam